Cezary Andrzej Pazura (born 13 June 1962 in Tomaszów Mazowiecki) is a Polish actor known for his comedy roles in movies such as Kiler, Chłopaki nie płaczą, Kariera Nikosia Dyzmy and the sitcom 13 posterunek. In addition to his work as a movie actor, Pazura is also a stand-up comedian and a voice actor. He provided voice for movies dubbed in Polish including Lady and the Tramp (as the Tramp), Ice Age (as Sid), Astérix & Obélix: Mission Cléopâtre (as Nubernaibs), Shark Tale (as Oscar) and for Pink Panther in various computer games. His brother Radosław Pazura is also an actor.

Selected filmography

 Pogrzeb lwa (1986)
 Czarne stopy (1987) – Puma
 Deja vu (1990) – Nemetsky velosipedist
 Kroll (1991) – Cpl. Wiaderny
 V.I.P. (1991) – Małyszko
 Rozmowy kontrolowane (1991) – Soldier
 Czarne słońca (1992) – Jan
 Zwolnieni z życia (1992)
 1968. Szczęśliwego Nowego Roku (1992) – Policeman
 Pogranicze w ogniu (1992, TV Series) – Czarek Adamski
 Wielka wsypa (1992)
 Psy (1992) – Nowy
 Pierścionek z orłem w koronie (1992) – Kosior
 Kawalerskie życie na obczyźnie (1992) – Worker Wielgos
 Cynga (1992)
 Żegnaj Rockefeller (1993, TV Mini-Series) – Fredek
 Uprowadzenie Agaty (1993) – Policeman
 Człowiek z... (1993) – Bolek
 Balanga (1993) – Sergeant
 Lepiej być piękną i bogatą (1993) – Firefighter
 Tylko strach (1993, TV Movie) – Andrzej
 Pożegnanie z Marią (1993, based on This Way for the Gas, Ladies and Gentlemen) – Tomasz
 Enak (1993)
 Dwa księżyce (1993) – Paweł
  (1993, TV Movie)
 Trzy kolory. Biały (1994) – Le propriétaire du bureau de change (Bureau de Change Proprietor)
 Psy 2. Ostatnia krew (1994) – Nowy
 Oczy niebieskie (1994)
 Kraj świata (1994, TV Movie)
 Polska śmierć (1995) – Osso
 The Poison Tasters (1995) – Soldier
 Złote dno (1995)
 Nic śmiesznego (1995) – Adam Miauczyński
 Wielki tydzień (1995) – Piotrowski
 Tato (1995) – Cezary Kujawski
 Słodko gorzki (1996) – Trainer
 Engelchen (1996) – Andrzej
 Wirus (1996) – Michael
 Dzieci i ryby (1997) – Wiktor
 Sara (1997) – Cezary / Józef's man
 Sztos (1997) – Synek
 Szczęśliwego Nowego Jorku (1997) – Azbest
 Kiler (1997) – Jurek Kiler
 13 posterunek (1997–1998, TV Series) – Cezary Cezary
 Kiler-ów 2-óch (1999) – Jurek Kiler
 Ajlawju (1999) – Adam Miauczyński
 13 posterunek 2 (2000, TV Series) – Czarek
 Zakochani (2000) – Szczepan Zadymek
 Chłopaki nie płaczą (2000) – Fred
 Kariera Nikosia Dyzmy (2002) – Nikodem 'Nikoś' Dyzma
 Dzień świra - Facet na ulicy
 E=mc2 (2002) – Andrzej 'Ramzes' Nowicki
 Show (2003) – Czarek
 Zutaten für Träume (2003) – Janek
 Nienasycenie (2003) – Zypcio's father / Putrycydes Tengler / Kocmołuchowicz
 Magiczna Gwiazda (2003) – Archibald (voice)
 Emilia (2005) – Indiana Dżones
 Ja wam pokażę! (2006) – Tomasz Leon Kozłowski – Ex-husband of Judyta, Father of Tosia
 Oficerowie (2006, TV Mini-Series) – Marek Sznajder
 Lejdis (2008) – Narrator (voice)
 Złoty środek (2009) – Stefan
 Skrzydlate świnie (2010) – Krzysztof Dzikowski
 Piotrek Trzynastego (2010) – Ranger
 Belcanto (2010) – Mariusz Marzeda
 Weekend (2010)
 Sztos 2 (2012) – Synek
 Felix, Net i Nika oraz teoretycznie możliwa katastrofa (2012) – Manfred (voice)
 Antyterapia (2014) – Marecki
 Bangistan (2015) – Tom
 Złote krople (2016) – Chancellor (voice)
 Saga o trzech prawiczkach (2017) – Father
 Volta (2017) - Dabrowszczak Jędrek / Złotousty 
 Papierowe gody (2017) – Therapist
 Pitbull. Ostatni pies (2018) – 'Gawron'
 7 uczuć (2018) – Friend
 Diablo. Ultimate Race (2019) – Jarosz
 Kurier (2019) – Tenant
 Futro z misia (2019) – 'Dzik'
 Psy 3: W imię zasad (2020) – Waldemar Morawiec 'Nowy'
 Możesz być kim chcesz (2020) – Guest
 Maszyna losująca
 Sexify (2021–2023) – Marek Nowicki, Monika's father

Discography
 Płyta stereofoniczna (1999)

References 

Polish male actors
Polish film actors
Polish television actors
Polish male stage actors
Polish cabaret performers
Polish film directors
Polish YouTubers
Polish male voice actors
1962 births
Living people
Łódź Film School alumni
Polish male singers
Polish Roman Catholics